Albert Stanley "Lefty" Clauss (June 23, 1891 – September 13, 1952) was a Major League Baseball pitcher. In 5 career games, he had a 0–1 record, with a 4.73 ERA. He batted right and threw left-handed.

Clauss was born and died in New Haven, Connecticut.

External links 
 Baseball Reference.com page

1891 births
1952 deaths
Detroit Tigers players
Major League Baseball pitchers
Saginaw Trailers players
Jackson Convicts players
Lincoln Tigers players
Lincoln Railsplitters players
Baseball players from New Haven, Connecticut
Boyne City Boosters players